Dichlorodifluoroethane (also known as 1,1-dichloro-1,2-difluoroethane or R-132) is a hydrochlorofluorocarbon with the chemical formula ). It is a volatile derivative ethane. It appears as a colourless, odorless non-flammable liquid. The use of Dichlorodifluoroethane is restricted by the US EPA through the Clean Air Act Amendments of 1990 which intend to phase-out the use of substances that deplete the ozone layer, HCFC-132 is cited as an ozone depleting substance, it is considered as a class II substance by the EPA.

See also 

 F-Gases
 List of Refrigerants

References 

Hydrochlorofluorocarbons